Wang Tien-ging (born 27 July 1947) is a Taiwanese politician who served in the Legislative Yuan from 1990 to 2002.

Education
Wang attended primary and secondary schools in Kaohsiung before earning a bachelor's degree from Chinese Culture University and a master's degree from Roosevelt University.

Political career
Wang joined the Kuomintang in 1965, and left for the People First Party shortly after its establishment in 2000. As a legislator, he maintained an interest in the military and defense. Wang did not receive a legislative nomination from the People First Party in 2001, and launched an independent campaign to represent Kaohsiung's first district. In November 2001, Wang was one of four legislative candidates indicted on charges of vote buying. Of those four candidates, Wang, Hsiao-Chin-lan, and Chuan Wen-sheng lost, while Hsu Chih-ming retained his seat. After stepping down from the legislature, Wang returned to the Kuomintang.

Personal life
Wang is married to Chou Liang-tai.

References

1947 births
Living people
Chinese Culture University alumni
Roosevelt University alumni
Kaohsiung Members of the Legislative Yuan
Kuomintang Members of the Legislative Yuan in Taiwan
Members of the 1st Legislative Yuan in Taiwan
Members of the 2nd Legislative Yuan
Members of the 3rd Legislative Yuan
Members of the 4th Legislative Yuan
People First Party Members of the Legislative Yuan